Aleksandar Dimitrić (born 29 February 1996) is a Serbian football forward who plays for Mladost Novi Sad.

Club career

Inđija
Born in Loznica, Dimitrić started his senior career with Inđija, and he made 6 appearances until the end of in the 2013–14 Serbian First League season, all as a back-up player. At the beginning of next season, Dimitrić was loaned to zone league club Ljukovo, where he spent 6 months. During the spring half of 2014–15 season, Dimitrić collected 14 appearances, usually in starting 11. He also scored 3 goals, 2 against Moravac Mrštane, and 1 against Mačva Šabac. For the first half of 2015–16 Serbian First League season, Dimitrić played all 15 fixtures scoring 1 goal, and also appeared in 2 cup matches.

Javor Ivanjica
Dimitrić signed a three-year contract with Javor Ivanjica in January 2016. He made his SuperLiga debut in a home match against Radnik Surdulica, played on 12 March 2016, under coach Mladen Dodić, replacing Marko Kolaković in 76 minute of match. Coach Miloš Veselinović gave a chance to Dimitrić at the beginning of 2016–17 Serbian SuperLiga season in starting 11, but later he moved on six-month loan to Kolubara in last days of summer transfer window 2016. In summer 2017, Dimitrić terminated a contract with Javor.

Radnički Sombor
In January 2020, Dimitrić moved to FK Radnički Sombor.

Career statistics

References

External links
 Aleksandar Dimitrić stats at utakmica.rs
 

1996 births
Living people
People from Inđija
Association football forwards
Serbian footballers
FK Inđija players
FK Javor Ivanjica players
FK Kolubara players
FK Radnički 1923 players
OFK Bačka players
FK Radnički Sombor players
Serbian First League players
Serbian SuperLiga players